Lenny the Lion may refer to:
Lenny the Lion, puppet appearing with English ventriloquist Terry Hall 
Lenny the Lion, character on American comedy-variety television show Saturday Night Live 
Lenny the Lion, character in Dutch/Japanese animated television series Ox Tales
Lenny the Lion, club mascot of English football club Shrewsbury Town F.C.
Lenny the Lion, mascot of the Lionel Corporation
Lenny the Lion, ambassador character for children's diabetes created by Medtronic
Lenny the Lion, mascot of the British and Irish Lions rugby union team